The Candidates Tournament 2018 was an eight-player double round-robin chess tournament, which was held in Berlin, Germany, between 10–28 March 2018. The winner, Fabiano Caruana, earned the right to challenge the defending world champion, Magnus Carlsen of Norway, in the World Chess Championship 2018 match.

FIDE's commercial partner Agon was the official organizer.

Organization

The tournament was contested as an eight player, double round-robin tournament, meaning there were 14 rounds with each player facing each other twice: once with the black pieces and once with the white pieces.

Prize fund
The prize fund (Regulations 3.8.1) was €420,000 (US$516,000). Prize money was divided equally between players with the same score.

Regulations
The time control was 100 minutes for the first 40 moves, 50 minutes for the next 20 moves and then 15 minutes for the rest of the game; plus a 30-second increment per move starting from move 1.

In the event of a tie, the following tie breaks were used, in order:
 Results in the games between the tied players;
 The most wins;
 Sonneborn–Berger score;
 Two tie break games between each tied player, at a time limit of 25 minutes, plus 10 second increment per move;
 Two tie break games between each tied player, at a time limit of 5 minutes, plus 3 second increment per move;
 Armageddon games, at a time limit of 5 minutes for white, and 4 minutes for black, plus 3 seconds per move after move 60; with white having to win and black having to draw or win. If more than two players tied, they were to play a knock-out tournament.

Controversies
Several players criticized the organization of the tournament. In particular, there were complaints about noise in the playing venue, bathroom facilities, hotel accommodations, and even television screens with commentary on the tournament that were visible to the players during the games. Sergey Karjakin summed up the complaints after round one: "Actually I don't like almost anything in the organization of the tournament. I don't like the hotel, I don't like the venue and also it was a few times very noisy during the game. I don't want to say that I lost because of all these things, but I basically don't like anything."

FIDE announced a "Live Moves Broadcasting Policy" that they proposed to apply to the tournament. This was widely seen as an attack on third-party broadcasters of the event, such as Chess24 and Chessbrah. The policy was also seen as a continuation of FIDE's legal fight with Chess24 and other Internet sites.

Qualifiers

There were five different qualification paths to the Candidates Tournament. In order of priority, these are: loser of the World Chess Championship 2016 match, the top two finishers in the Chess World Cup 2017, the top two finishers in the FIDE Grand Prix 2017, next two highest rated players (average FIDE rating on the 12 monthly lists from January to December 2017, with at least 30 games played) who played in Chess World Cup 2017 or FIDE Grand Prix 2017, and one player nominated by the organizers (Agon).

Two players qualified by average rating of 2017. By September 2017, it was clear that this was a three-man race between Fabiano Caruana, Wesley So and Vladimir Kramnik. By mid-October 2017, Caruana and So had a near-decisive lead, but this was resolved on October 30 when Kramnik was named as the wild card candidate, assuring Caruana and So of qualifying by rating. According to the regulations, the first reserve player was the next highest placed player in the Grand Prix, Teimour Radjabov, and further reserves were the next highest players by their average of the 2017 ratings lists, starting with Maxime Vachier-Lagrave.

Qualifiers by rating
The following were the final placings of players attempting to qualify by the 2017 rating lists.

The list omits world champion Magnus Carlsen. Players who qualified for the Candidates Tournament by other means are shown with a shaded background. The two qualifiers by rating were Fabiano Caruana and Wesley So (marked with a green background).

Predictions
Before the tournament, Maxime Vachier-Lagrave (the highest rated player not playing, other than world champion Carlsen) considered the joint favourites to be Aronian and Caruana, and also noted that the betting markets said a similar thing. He considered the next most likely to be either Mamedyarov or Kramnik.

Schedule
FIDE announced the pairings one month before the event. There was a country-diversion system, so players from the same country meet as early as possible. Grischuk, Karjakin, and Kramnik (all from Russia) played each other in rounds 1, 2 and 3 as well as with colours reversed in rounds 8, 9 and 10. Similarly So and Caruana (both from the United States) played each other in rounds 1 and 8.

Games began at 15:00 local time (14:00 UTC before March 25, 13:00 UTC after March 25), each day from March 10 to 27, except for rest days on March 13, 17, 21, and 25 (after rounds 3, 6, 9 and 12 respectively). If needed, tiebreak games were to be played on March 28. The opening ceremony was on March 9, and the closing ceremony on March 28.

Summary

Caruana, Mamedyarov and Kramnik all won in round 1, then Kramnik took the lead with a brilliant win with black against Aronian in round 3. However, he started playing very optimistically, and consistently overestimated his position in the subsequent rounds. This led to him losing tough games, first to Caruana in round 4, then to Mamedyarov in round 6. At the halfway point, the scores were Caruana +3; Mamedyarov +2; Kramnik, Grischuk and Ding even; Karjakin −1, and So and Aronian −2. 2016 challenger Karjakin had suffered two losses in the early rounds. Aronian, one of the pre-tournament favourites, had bounced back from his loss to Kramnik with a win over Karjakin, but was promptly defeated by So, and was equal last.

In the middle portion of the tournament, Aronian and Karjakin both tried to make up ground. Karjakin was successful, with wins with white in rounds 7 and 9; while Aronian sought complications, but could not win any more games, and then lost in round 10 to Kramnik. Karjakin then beat Aronian with black in Round 11, joining Grischuk in equal third place on +1. Caruana and Mamedyarov continued to lead, but both drew all their games from rounds 8 to 11, staying on +3 and +2 respectively. 

In a sensational round 12, the two leaders each lost for the first time: Caruana to Karjakin, and Mamedyarov to Ding Liren, who had drawn every game to that point. This left five players in contention with 2 rounds to go: Karjakin and Caruana on +2 (with Karjakin leading on tie break), and Mamedyarov, Grischuk and Ding on +1.

In the penultimate round (round 13), Mamedyarov and Caruana defeated Grischuk and Aronian respectively, while Ding Liren and Karjakin drew their games. That gave Caruana (+3) a half-point lead over Karjakin and Mamedyarov (+2) going into the final round, with Ding (+1) a further half-point back. Caruana had worse tie breaks than Mamedyarov and Karjakin, so he had to finish ahead of both of them to win the tournament. Ding Liren also had a mathematical chance to win on tie breaks if all results went his way.

In the last round, Karjakin pressed hard for a win with white against Ding, but after a blunder had to scramble for a draw. Meanwhile, Mamedyarov managed to get a complicated game with black against Kramnik, but could not get enough winning chances and also drew. Caruana obtained a strong position with black against Grischuk and converted it to a win, even though the other games finished before his, meaning he only required a draw to win the tournament.

Assessments
In a long interview the day after the Candidates ended, Caruana discussed his pre-tournament training, which involved his long-time second Rustam Kasimdzhanov and other grandmasters Cristian Chirila, Leinier Domínguez and Alejandro Ramírez. Caruana reviewed his progress through the tournament and was critical of his tendency to sit on the lead with overly defensive play. He believed that such defensiveness contributed to his twelfth round loss to Karjakin, which threw the tournament open for his competitors. However, Caruana felt that his ability to forget losses relatively quickly was important in his crucial victories against Aronian and Grischuk in the final two rounds. He also estimated his chances against Carlsen in the world championship match as "about 50-50."

At a charity event several days after the tournament, Kramnik and Karjakin also discussed the Candidates. Kramnik said that his "very aggressive and very uncompromising" play might not have been the best practical choice but at least it showed fighting spirit. Karjakin regretted his "terrible start" but thought that Caruana's eventual victory was a "quite fair" result. Both players agreed that Caruana has his chances in the world championship match, though Carlsen remains the favorite.

Results

Standings
Note: Numbers in the crosstable in a white background indicate the result playing the respective opponent with the white pieces (black pieces if on a black background).

Results by round
First named player is white. 1–0 indicates a white win, 0–1 indicates a black win, and ½–½ indicates a draw. Numbers in parentheses show players' scores prior to the round.

Points by round

For each player, the difference between wins and losses after each round is shown.
The players with the highest difference for each round are marked with green background.
The players with no more chance of advancing to the title match, in each round, are marked with red background.

References

External links

 Official tournament site 

2018
2018 in chess
2018 in German sport
Chess in Germany
International sports competitions hosted by Germany
Sports competitions in Berlin
2018 in Berlin
March 2018 sports events in Germany